Eschscholzia parishii, with the common name Parish's poppy, is an annual desert wildflower in the Poppy family (Papaveraceae), native to several North American desert regions.

This desert species is related to the California poppy (Eschscholzia californica), that's found in Mediterranean climate regions of the state.

Distribution
Eschscholzia parishii is native to the Mojave Desert and the Colorado Desert surrounding the Salton Sea in southern California, and southwards across the Sonoran Desert southwards along the Gulf of California to the vicinity of Bahía de los Ángeles, Baja California.

External links

CalFlora Database: Eschscholzia parishii (Parish's poppy)
Jepson Manual eFlora (TJM2) treatment of Eschscholzia parishii
UC Photos gallery — Eschscholzia parishii

parishii
Flora of the California desert regions
Flora of Baja California
Flora of the Sonoran Deserts
Natural history of the Colorado Desert
Natural history of the Mojave Desert
Flora without expected TNC conservation status